Giovanni Andrea dell'Anguillara (1517–1570) was an Italian poet.

He was born in Sutri, in Lazio. He worked as a proof-reader.

He translated Ovid's Metamorphoses in ottava rima, and wrote a tragedy Edippo (1565, i.e. Oedipus).

External links 
 
 Title page of Edippo
 Montanari, Giacomo. Between Poetry and Painting: Giovanni Andrea dell’Anguillara’s Metamorfosi as a Model for Genoese Baroque Poets and Painters, in Actual Problems of Theory and History of Art: Collection of articles. Vol. 8. Ed. S. V. Mal’tseva, E. Iu. Staniukovich-Denisova, A. V. Zakharova.  St. Petersburg, St. Petersburg Univ. Press, 2018, pp. 162–169. ISSN 2312-2129

1517 births
1570 deaths
Italian poets
Italian male poets